The 1966 NAIA Soccer Championship was the eighth annual tournament held by the NAIA to determine the national champion of men's college soccer among its members in the United States.

Quincy (IL) defeated two-time defending champions Trenton State in the final, 6–1, to claim the Hawks' first NAIA national title.

The final was played at Belmont Abbey College in Belmont, North Carolina.

Bracket

See also  
 1966 NCAA Soccer Championship

References 

NAIA championships
NAIA
1966 in sports in North Carolina